Bantiella is a genus of mantis in the family Thespidae.

See also
List of mantis genera and species

References

 
Thespidae
Mantodea genera
Taxa named by Ermanno Giglio-Tos